Andersen v. Eighth Judicial District Court, 135 Nev. Adv. Op. 42 (2019), was a landmark decision of the Nevada Supreme Court in which the Court entitled every defendant charged with misdemeanor domestic battery to a jury trial in the State of Nevada. The case has been called "the most significant Nevada Supreme Court case of the 21st century."

Background
In Andersen v. Eighth Judicial District Court, the defendant was charged with battery which constitutes domestic violence, a first offense, and was set to stand trial in the Las Vegas Municipal Court. He asked for a jury trial, but in accordance with longstanding Nevada law, was told he was not entitled to a jury for a misdemeanor charge. He pled no contest and was found guilty, and appealed his conviction based on the fact that he was denied his right to a jury.

Decision
The case eventually made it to the Nevada Supreme Court. Andersen's attorney Michael Pariente argued that a defendant charged with battery constituting domestic violence has a Sixth Amendment right to a jury trial because a defendant loses his or her Second Amendment right upon conviction of the offense by letting a judge, and not a jury, decide guilt or innocence. The Court reversed the defendant's conviction, and declared that henceforth, for the first time since Nevada became a state in 1864, every defendant charged with misdemeanor domestic battery is entitled to a jury trial.

"The Nevada Supreme Court’s Sept. 12 decision held that misdemeanor domestic violence defendants are entitled to a jury trial because of a 2017 law banning those convicted of the crime from owning guns. The ban on gun ownership elevated the crime from a petty offense that doesn’t entitle a defendant to a jury to a more serious offense with jury rights, the court said."

References

21st-century American trials
Crimes in Nevada
Nevada state case law